Richard Harrison (born May 26, 1936) is an American actor, writer, director and producer. Harrison was very prolific and worked with most of the better-known names in European B-movies during the 1960s and 1970s, branching out to exploitation films shot all over the world in the early 1970s. 

He worked with directors ranging from established names like Antonio Margheriti and Marino Girolami to infamous Z-movie directors like Paolo Solvay, Godfrey Ho and Alfonso Brescia. Harrison's co-stars ranged from major and minor stars of the time like Anita Ekberg, Michèle Mercier, Klaus Kinski, Fernando Sancho and Helmut Berger to obscure cult actors such as Mike Monty and Romano Kristoff.

Early life
Born in Salt Lake City, Utah, Harrison left for Los Angeles at 17, where he found work first at the Vic Tanny and Bert Goodrich gyms. Many people working in the film industry trained at the gym and these encounters led Harrison to study acting. In 1961 he married Loretta Nicholson, the daughter of American International Pictures co-chief James H. Nicholson.

American film appearances
He appeared in a Santa Monica stage production, then in TV, then in small parts in feature films. Harrison worked at Twentieth Century Fox under acting coach Sandy Meiser where he made an appearance at the beginning of South Pacific along with Tom Laughlin and Ron Ely. He eventually signed a three-film deal with American International Pictures, which led him to Italy, where he remained for almost three decades, appearing in sword and sandal films, then Eurospy films and Spaghetti Westerns. Formal acting studies set Harrison apart from other muscular American actors working in Italy in the early 1960s, such as Brad Harris and Steve Reeves, with whom he is often grouped.

1960s European movies
Harrison relocated to Italy in the early 1960s with his first wife Loretta initially in a three-picture contract with producer Italo Zingarelli. He remained in Italy and became a leading star in sword and sandal films, Eurospy films and later Spaghetti Westerns. His first Italian film and the first starring role were in The Invincible Gladiator (1962), directed by Alberto De Martino and Antonio Momplet. Arguably Harrison's most well-known film from his early career is the western Gunfight at Red Sands (Duello Nel Texas), directed by Ricardo Blasco in 1963. Gunfight at Red Sands is also noteworthy for being the first Italian Western to feature an Ennio Morricone score. Harrison turned down Sergio Leone's A Fistful of Dollars and recommended Clint Eastwood for the role. Harrison joked that this was his greatest contribution to cinema.

The 1968 film Joko - Invoca Dio... e muori  Vengeance, directed by Antonio Margheriti, is another favorite among Spaghetti Western fans. Luciano Martino's 1965 movie Secret Agent Fireball, Harrison's first Eurospy film, is also often cited as his best film in the genre, and one of his better earlier films. He again played the role of CIA Agent Fleming in a sequel Killers Are Challenged in 1966.

The Italian actor Bruno Piergentili who made European features during this period was given the name "Dan Harrison", perhaps to evoke Richard's name.

1970s exploitation films
Harrison's career dwindled slowly in the 1970s at the same rate as the Spaghetti Western died. He began appearing in low-budget movies shot all over the world: In Egypt (You Can Do a Lot with 7 Women (1971), with the Shaw Brothers in Hong Kong starring in the title role of Marco Polo (1975) and playing the German commander von Waldersee in The Boxer Rebellion (1976). Harrison worked in Turkey (The Godfather's Friend, 1972), directed by Farouk "Frank" Agrama, and as Sgt. Taylor in a Yugoslavian war film, the 1979 effort Pakleni otok, directed by Vladimir Tadej.

He made most of his better quality 70s films during the earlier half of the decade, like the comic Spaghetti Western Due Fratelli  Two Brothers in Trinity (1972), which he also directed. His co-star in Due Fratelli was the Irish American actor Donald O'Brien, another veteran of Italian B-films. Harrison and O'Brien played two estranged brothers rejoined after receiving an inheritance, Harrison a "lovable rogue", O'Brien a pious Mormon. Harrison wants to spend his money on building a bordello, and comic adventures in the spirit of the Terence Hill/Bud Spencer hit My Name is Trinity (1971) follow.

Other notable early 70s films were Churchill's Leopards (1970), directed by Maurizio Pradeaux and also starring Giacomo Rossi Stuart and Klaus Kinski, in which Harrison got to play a double role; Acquasanta Joe (1971), directed by Mario Gariazzo and starring Ty Hardin and Lincoln Tate, an otherwise mediocre western worth mentioning for having Harrison cast against type as a villain; and Dig Your Grave, Friend...Sabata's Coming (1971), directed by Juan Bosch, a western livened up by the presence of Spanish actor Fernando Sancho. Harrison acted in several films with Sancho, the archetypal Mexican bandit of paella and Spaghetti Westerns, most of which were produced and/or directed by Ignacio F. Iquino.

One of the more successful Harrison films from the latter half of the 70s was the Italian crime thriller La Belva Col Mitra (1977)  Beast With a Gun, directed by Sergio Grieco, also starring Helmut Berger and Marisa Mell. Harrison played the part of Police Commissioner Giulio Santini, with top-billed Berger as psychotic criminal Nanni Vitali, out to kill Santini and everyone else who testified against him in court. Although La Belva Col Mitra is no classic, it's a well-directed movie and the contrast between Harrison's underplayed style and Berger's manic performance works in its favor. However, La Belva Col Mitra is not without some controversy. Apparently, at Berger's request, Harrison's scenes were cut down in the film. For additional trivia, a scene from La Belva Col Mitra shows up on TV in the Quentin Tarantino film Jackie Brown (1997).

Probably the most interesting curio in Harrison's 70s filmography is the 1971 film L'Explosion, directed by Marc Simenon (the son of Georges Simenon) and co-starring Mylène Demongeot. The 1978 martial arts/spy film Challenge of the Tiger is also of curio interest, if only for the presence of Bruce Lee imitator Bruce Le (who also directed the film, with noncredit help from Paolo Solvay), European soft core star Nadiuska and Harrison's son Sebastian.

Z-movies in Asia

In the 1980s, Harrison found himself mostly stranded in B-movie action films made in the Philippines and Hong Kong. Although generally considered the lowest point of Harrison's career, some of his 80s films have gained a cult audience of their own.

In the Philippines, Harrison acted in five ultralow-budget actioners, best classified as Z-movies, produced by K.Y. Lim for Silver Star Film Company (called Kinavesa in the Philippines). Three, Fireback, Hunter's Crossing and Blood Debts (1983), were directed by Teddy Page, and two, Intrusion Cambodia (1984) and Rescue Team by John Gale. All were bad, but the three Page films exceptionally so, mixing near-sadistic violence with childlike, enthusiastic naivety reminiscent of the films of Ed Wood. In the books Gods in Polyester and Gods in Spandex, Harrison states that he wrote some of the screenplays for the Filipino films practically overnight, using a pseudonym. The Fire back screenplay Harrison wrote is credited to "Timothy Jorge", a pseudonym usually used by Don Gordon Bell, one of the expatriate American actors working for Silver Star. Harrison also mentions that the Silver Star films he acted in didn't have complete shooting scripts and many scenes were improvised on the spot, which contributed to their disjointed narrative.

Silver Star recycled the same group of American and European expatriate actors from film to film, all of whom appeared in the Harrison vehicles. Mike Monty, an old acquaintance of Harrison from the Italian days who had migrated to the archipelago, James Gaines, Romano Kristoff, Bruce Baron, Ann Milhench and others. Harrison struck a friendship with Kristoff, one of the leading Silver Star actors, and later invited him to Italy to act in a film he produced and directed, Three Men on Fire (1986).

At the time they were made, the poor quality of the Filipino films hurt Harrison's reputation. Over the years, they have attracted some cult interest in bad movie fandom. Although he remembers Teddy Page fondly, Harrison doesn't have too many kind words for Lim and working for the Silver Star.

In Hong Kong, Harrison starred in what was supposed to be a small number of low-budget martial arts "ninja" films, directed by Chinese filmmaker Godfrey Ho, with whom he was already familiar from working for the Shaw Brothers in the 1970s. However, Ho later re-edited his scenes into many more films in a cut-and-paste style of filmmaking that has since made him infamous. Harrison found himself the unwilling star of at least twenty-four different movies, with titles like Ninja Terminator, Cobra Vs. Ninja, Golden Ninja Warrior and Diamond Ninja Force. Like the Silver Star productions, the "ninja" films have since become cult films. Disgusted with that outcome, Harrison returned to the United States.

In 1991, Harrison played Jack Roth in the drama film Lies of the Twins opposite Aidan Quinn, Isabella Rossellini and Iman. Directed by Tim Hunter, much of the movie was shot at Harrison's beach-front home in Malibu. The film was generally well received by critics upon release.

Harrison subsequently slowed down his film work over the next few years. His last movies to date were the 1993 erotic thriller Angel Eyes and the 2000 film Jerks. Angel Eyes was directed by the prolific cinematographer/director Gary Graver, and starred Erik Estrada, John Phillip Law and Monique Gabrielle.

Some of the more noteworthy movies in Harrison's later career were the Moroccan film Amok (1982) and Dark Mission (1987), by both loved and hated Spanish director Jesús Franco. The latter might not be much better than Harrison's Filipino films in terms of quality but did have a more-interesting-than-usual cast featuring Christopher Lee, Christopher Mitchum and French adult film star Brigitte Lahaie (also known for appearing in the horror films of Jean Rollin).

One of the few serious roles that Harrison portrayed in the 1980s was that of American President Andrew Johnson in Ali Hatami's Iranian production Hajji Washington. The film was completed in 1982 but was not screened in Iran until 1998.

He has since founded a, now defunct, multisystem electronics company named Gladiator Electronics with his son Sebastian.

Partial filmography

Kronos (1957), as Pilot
Jeanne Eagels (1957), as Cpl. Hodgson (uncredited)
South Pacific (1958), as Co-Pilot
Too Much, Too Soon (1958), as Swimming Companion (uncredited)
Battle Flame (1959), as 2nd Lt. Wechsler
Tall Story (1960), as Student (uncredited)
Master of the World (1961), as Alistair
The Invincible Gladiator (1961), as Rezius
Avenger of the Seven Seas  Il giustiziere dei mari (1962), as Lieutenant David Robinson
Gladiators 7 (1962), as Darius
Medusa Against the Son of Hercules  Perseo l'invincibile (1963), as Perseo
Il pirata del diavolo  The Saracens (1963), as Marco Trevisan
Duello nel Texas  Gunfight at Red Sands  Gringo (1963), as Ricardo 'Gringo' Martinez
 Sons of Vengeance (1964), as Jeff Walker
Messalina vs. the Son of Hercules  L'ultimo gladiatore (1964), as Glaucus
The Two Gladiators  Fight or Die (1964), as Lucius Crassus
Revolt of the Praetorians (1964), as Velerio Rufo
Giants of Rome (1964), as Claudius Marcellus
Adventures of the Bengal Lancers (1964), as Sgt. Frankie Ross
Jungle Adventurer  Temple of a Thousand Lights (1965), as Alan Foster
Secret Agent Fireball (1965), as Bob Fleming
100.000 dollari per Ringo  $100,000 for Ringo (1965), as Lee 'Ringo' Barton
Bob Fleming... Mission Casablanca  Killers Are Challenged (1966), as Bob Fleming
El Rojo (1966), as Donald 'El Rojo' Sorensen
Ring Around the World  Duello nel mondo (1966), as Fred Lester
Master Stroke  Colpo maestro al servizio di Sua Maestà britannica (1967), as Arthur Lang / Owen
  28 Minutes for 3 Million Dollars (1967), as Jacques
L'uomo del colpo perfetto  Hot Diamonds in Cold Blood (1967), as Steve Norton
Fantabulous Inc. (1967), as Richard Werner aka Karl Meyer
Vengeance  Joko - Invoca Dio... e muori (1968), as Joko / Rocco Barrett
Day After Tomorrow  Uno dopo l'altro (1968), as Stan Ross
Between God, the Devil and a Winchester (1968), as Father Pat Jordan
C'era una volta un gangster (1969), as Larry Alfieri
36 Hours to Hell (1969), as Captain Stern
Pussycat, Pussycat, I Love You (1970), as Hero
Stagecoach of the Condemned (1970), as Robert Walton
Churchill's Leopards (1970), as Lt. Richard Benson / Lt. Hans Müller
Reverend's Colt (1970), as Sheriff Donovan
 (1971), as Max
Dig Your Grave Friend... Sabata's Coming (1971), as Steve McGowan
His Name Was King (1971), as John 'King' Marley
Holy Water Joe (1971), as Charlie Bennett
Lo sceriffo di Rockspring  Sheriff of Rock Springs (1971), as The Sheriff
You Can Do a Lot with 7 Women  Si può fare molto con 7 donne (1972), as Mike Spencer
Two Brothers in Trinity (1972), as Jesse Smith
  Deadly Trackers (1972), as Jeff Carter / James Luke / Django
Los fabulosos de Trinidad (1972), as Scott
The Godfather's Friend  The Way of the Godfather (1972), as Richard Maddock
Joe Dakota (1972), as Joe Dakota
Pugni, pirati e karatè (1973), as Gargantua / 'Garga'
Dört Hergele (1974)
Anasinin Gozu (1974)
 (1974)
Una donna per 7 bastardi (1974), as Cripple
Un viaje de locos (1974)
Yankesici (1975)
Marco Polo  The Four Assassins (1975), as Marco Polo
The Boxer Rebellion  The Bloody Avengers (1976), as General von Waldersee, the German Commander
Achtung! The Desert Tigers (1977), as Maj. Lexman
Natascha - Todesgrüße aus Moskau (1977), as Bukow
La belva col mitra  Beast with a Gun (1977), as Santini
Clouzot & C. contro Borsalino & C. (1977), as Borsalino
Chubby Chiro's Big Con (1978)
Sahit (1978)
Provincia violenta (1978), as Augusto
Napoli... i 5 della squadra speciale (1978), as Areangeli
Black Gold Dossier (1979), as Richard Benson
Pakleni otok (1979), as Americki narednik Taylor
Napoli storia d'amore e di vendetta (1979), as Frank
Don't Trust the Mafia (1979), as Questore Ferrari
Challenge of the Tiger  Gymkata Killer (1980), as Richard Cannon
  Voodoo Baby (1980), as Paul
La mondana nuda (1980)
Hajji Washington (1982), as President Andrew Johnson / Grover Cleveland
Corri come il vento, Kiko (1982), as Guido
Rescue Team (1983)
Hunter's Crossing (1983), as Burns Jr.
Fireback (1983), as Jack Kaplan
Intrusion Cambodia (1983)
Amok (1983), as Elton Horn
Zhi zun shen tou (1984)
Blood Debts  Eliminator (1985), as Mark Collins
È arrivato mio fratello  Here's My Brother (1985), as Spinetti
Ninja Terminator (1985), as Ninja master Harry
Ninja Holocaust (1985)
Lei ting chu chuan (1985), as Richard
Three Men on Fire (1986), as Mathews - CIA agent
Ninja the Protector (1986), as Ninja Master Gordon Anderson
Ninja Champion (1986), as Richard
Ninja Thunderbolt (1986), as Richard
The Ninja Squad (1986), as Ninja master Gordon
Ninja Hunt (1986)
Ninja Dragon (1986), as Ninja Master Gordon
Golden Ninja Warrior (1986)
Ninja Kill (1987), as Ninja master Gordon
Ninja Operation: Licensed to Terminate (1987)
Evil Spawn (1987), as Max Adrian
Hitman the Cobra (1987), as Phillip
Ninja: Silent Assassin (1987), as Ninja Master Gordon
Operação Ninja III (1987), as Ninja Master Gordon
Ninja Commandments (1987), as Ninja Master Gordon
Ninja Avengers (1987), as Master Gordon
Cobra vs. Ninja (1987), as Ninja master Gordon
The Ninja Showdown (1988), as Ninja Master Gordon
Ninja Powerforce (1988), as Ninja Master Gordon
Ninja: The Bootlace Philosophy (1988)
Diamond Ninja Force (1988), as Ninja Master Gordon
Hands of Death (1988)
Dark Mission (1988), as Lt. Sparks
The Power of Ninjitsu (1988), as Gordon
Scorpion Thunderbolt (1988)
Ninja Strike Force (1988), as Ninja Master Gordon
Gemini, the Twin Stars (1988), as Senator Buffington
Above the War (1989), as General O'Connor
Terminal Force (1989), as Nick Tyree
Operation Las Vegas (1990), as Jefferson
Highway to Hell (1990)
Empire of the Dark (1990), as Arkham
The Channeler (1991), as Jack
Lies of the Twins (1991), as Jack Roth
Paid to Kill (1991), as James Burton
Angel Eyes (1993), as Vince
Un affare trasversale (1998)
Jerks (2000)

Bibliography
Harrison contributed pieces on his 1970s and 1980s films to two compilations:
Gods In Polyester, or, A Survivors' Account of 70's Cinema Obscura (2004)
Gods In Spandex, or, A Survivors' Account of 80's Cinema Obscura (2007)

References

External links
In-depth interview on video
French-made documentary about Richard Harrison

Richard Harrison and his movies:

semi-official Richard Harrison site by John. P. Dulaney
Interview Nanarland.com interviews Richard Harrison about his career
Brian's Drive-In Theater A B-movie website with a section on Richard Harrison
Richard Harrison biography on (re)Search my Trash

Miscellaneous:
An interview of Kent Wills at www.dighkmovies.com, featuring a lot on information on Godfrey Ho and the seedier side of the Hong Kong film industry
The Spaghetti Western Database
An article on spaghetti western at www.wildeast.net
The Spaghetti Western web board, a discussion forum for all things Spaghetti Western related.
A Fistful of Westerns, a Spaghetti Western site with basic profiles on some actors, general information and an interesting image gallery featuring vintage poster art
A gallery of cover scans from vintage sword and sandal videos

American male film actors
Male Spaghetti Western actors
American expatriates in Italy
1936 births
Living people
Male actors from Salt Lake City
Latter Day Saints from Utah
Latter Day Saints from California
20th Century Studios contract players